Patriarch Nectarius may refer to:

 Nectarius of Constantinople, ruled in 381–397
 Nectarius of Jerusalem, ruled in 1661–1669